Ethion (C9H22O4P2S4) is an organophosphate insecticide. Ethion is known to affect a neural enzyme called acetylcholinesterase and prevent it from working.

Review
Ethion was one of many substances that were approved for use based on data from Industrial Bio-Test Laboratories, which prompted the Food and Agriculture Organization and World Health Organization to recommend its reanalysis in 1982.

History 
In the 1950s, Ethion was first registered in the US as an insecticide. However, the usage of ethion has varied during the years due to overall crop values and weather conditions. For example, 1999 was a very dry year; the drought reduced yields, and the usage of ethion became less economically advantageous. Since 1998, serious studies for the risk assessment of ethion have been conducted by (among others) the EPA (United States Environmental Protection Agency). The risk assessments for ethion were presented at a July 14, 1999 briefing with stakeholders in Florida, which was followed by an opportunity for public comment on risk management for this pesticide.

Synthesis 
Ethion is produced under controlled pH conditions, by reacting dibromomethane with Diethyl dithiophosphoric acid in ethanol. Other  methods of manufacturing are the reaction of methylene bromide and sodium diethyl phosphorodithioate, and the reaction of diethyl dithiophosphoric acid and formaldehyde.

Reactivity and mechanism 
It is known that ethion is small and lipophilic molecule and because it has these characteristics rapid absorption across cell membranes is expected. This absorption from skin, lungs and the gut to the blood will happen via passive diffusion. Furthermore, ethion is changed in the liver, via desulfuration,  into its active metabolite: ethion monoxon. Due to this change happening in the liver the primary place of damage is expected to be the liver. Ethion monoxon is an inhibitor of the neuro enzyme cholinesterase (ChE). ChE is a facilitator of nerve impulse transmission, secondary of damage is thus the brain. Because ethion monoxon is an organophosphate its mechanism of action is thought to be the same. This mechanism works as follows (see the figure "Inhibition of cholinesterase by ethion monoxon."): a hydroxyl group from a serine residue in the active site from ChE is phosphorylated by the organophosphate, thereby inhibiting the enzyme.  The inhibition is a result of the inability of the serine hydroxyl group to participate in the hydrolysis of another enzyme called acetyl choline(Ach). In the figure it is indicated that inhibition reaction is a two step process. The phosphorylated form of the enzyme is highly stable, and depending on the R and R’ groups attached to the phosphorus this inhibition is reversible or irreversible.

Metabolism 
Goats exposed to ethion showed clear distinctions in excretion, absorption half-life and bioavailabilities. These differences depend on the method of administration. Intravenous injection resulted in a half-life time of 2 hours, while oral administration resulted in a half-life time of 10 hours. Dermal administration lead to a half-life time of even 85 hours. These differences in half-life times can be completed with a difference in bioavailability. The bio-availability of ethion in oral administration was less than 5%, whereas the bio-availability of dermal administration of ethion was 20%.

In a study conducted among rats, after oral administration it was found that ethion is quite readily metabolized. The metabolization products in found in urine are four to six polar water-soluble products.

A study among chickens reveals more about the ethion distribution in the body. After 10 days of ethion exposure liver, muscle, and fat tissues were examined. In all three cases ethion or ethion derivatives were present, indicating that it is widely spread in the body. Also chicken eggs were investigated. It was found that the egg white reaches a steady ethion derivative concentration after four days while the concentration in yolk was still rising after ten days. Also in the investigated chicken about six polar water-soluble metabolites were found.

In a goat study, also heart in kidney tissue was investigated after a period of ethion exposure, and in these tissue ethion-derivatives were found. This study also indicates that the highest level were found in the liver and kidneys and the lowest levels in fat. In goat milk derivatives were also present.

Biotransformation 
Ethion can undergo biotransformation in the human body, this happens in the liver. Ethion undergoes desulfurization here and is thereby changed in its active metabolite: ethion monoxon. This enzyme cytochrome P-450 catalyzes this step. Ethion monoxon is an inhibitor of the neuro enzyme cholinesterase (ChE), because it contains an active oxygen. Because ChE can dephosphorylate organophosphate, in the next step of the biotransformation ethion monoxon is dephosphorylated and ChE is phosphorylated. The next step in the biotransformation is not yet completely known, and that this happens via esterases in the blood and liver (1). Besides the dephosphorylation of ethion monoxon by ChE, it is likely that the ethion monoxon is partially oxidized toward ethion dioxon.

After solvent partitioning of urine from rats which had been fed ethion, it became clear that the metabolites found in the urine were 99% dissolved in the aqueous phase. This means that only nonsignificant levels (<1 %) were present in the organic phase and that the metabolites are very hydrophilic.

In a parallel study in goats, radioactive labeled ethion with incorporated 14C was used. After identification of the 14C residues in organs of the goats like the liver, heart, kidneys, muscles and fat tissue, it appeared that 0.03 ppm or less of the 14C compounds present was non-metabolized ethion. The metabolites ethion monoxon and ethion dioxon were also not detected in any samples with a substantial threshold (0.005-0.01 ppm). 64 to 75% of the metabolites from the tissues were soluble in methanol. After addition of a protease, another 17 to 32% were solubilized. In the aqueous phase, at least four different radioactive metabolites were found. However, characterization of these compounds was repeatedly unsuccessful due to their high volatility. One compound was trapped from the kidney and was identified as formaldehyde. This is an indication that the 14C of ethion are used in the formation of natural products.

Toxicity

Summary of toxicity 
Exposure to ethion can happen by ingestion, absorption via the skin and via inhalation. Exposure can lead to vomiting, diarrhea, headache, sweating and confusion. Severe poisoning might lead to fatigue, involuntary muscle contractions, loss of reflexes and slurred speech. In even more severe cases, death will be the result of respiratory failure or cardiac arrest.

When being exposed through skin exposure, the lowest dose to kill a rat was found to be 150 mg/kg for males and 50 mg/kg for females. The minimum survival time was 6 hours for female rats and 3 hours for male rats, the maximum time of death was 3 days for females and 7 days for males. The LD50 was 245 mg /kg for male rats and 62 mg/kg for female rats.

When being exposed through ingestion, 10 mg/kg/day and 2 mg/kg/day showed no histopathological effect on the respiratory track of rats, neither did 13-week testing on dogs (8.25 mg/kg/day).

LD50 values for pure ethion in rats of 208 mg/kg, and for technical ethion of 21 to 191 mg/kg. Other reported oral LD50 values are 40 mg/kg in mice and guinea pigs. Furthermore, inhalation of ethion is very toxic. During one study which was looking at technical-grade ethion, an LC50 of 2.31 mg/m^3 was found in male rats and of 0.45 mg/m^3 in female rats. Other data reported a 4-hour LC50 in rats of 0.864 mg/L.

Acute toxicity 
Ethion will result in toxic effects by absorption via the skin, ingestion and via inhalation. When the skin is exposed it may cause burns. According to Extoxnet, any form of exposure results in the following inconveniences: pallor, nausea, vomiting, diarrhea, abdominal cramps, headache, dizziness, eye pain, blurred vision, constriction or dilation of the eye pupils, tears, salivation, sweating, and confusion may develop within 12 hours. Severe poisoning may result in distorted coordination, loss of reflexes, slurred speech, fatigue and weakness, tremors of the tongue and eyelids, involuntary muscle contractions and can also lead to paralysis and respiratory problems. In more severe cases ethion poisoning can lead to involuntary discharge of urine or feces, irregular heart beats, psychosis, loss of consciousness and to coma or death. Death will be a result of respiratory failure or cardiac arrest. Hypothermia, AC heart blocks and arrhythmias are also found to be possible consequences of ethion poisoning. Ethion may also lead to delayed symptoms of other organophosphates.

Skin exposure 
In rabbits receiving 250 mg/kg of technical-grade ethion for 21 days, the dermal exposure lead to increased cases of erythema and desquamation. It also lead to inhibition of brain acetylcholinesterase at 1 mg/kg/day and the NOAEL was determined to be 0.8 mg/kg/day. In guinea pigs, ethion als lead to slight erythema, that cleared in 48 hours, and it was determined that the compound was not a skin sensitizer.

In a study determining the LD50 of ethion, 80 male and 60 female adult rats were dermally exposed to ethion dissolved in xylene. The lowest dose to kill a rat was found to be 150 mg/kg for males and 50 mg/kg for females. The minimum survival time was 6 hours for females and 3 hours for males, the maximum time of death was 3 days for females and 7 days for males. The LD50 was 245 mg /kg for males and 62 mg/kg for females. Skin contact with organophosphates in general may cause localized sweating and involuntary muscle contractions. Other studies found the LC50 via the dermal route to be 915 mg/kg in guinea pigs and 890 mg/kg in rabbits.

Ethion can also cause slight redness and inflammation to the eye and skin, this will clear within 48 hours. It is also known to cause blurred vision, pupil constriction and pain.

Ingestion 
A six-month-old boy experienced shallow excursions and intercostal retractions after accidentally ingesting 15.7 mg/kg ethion. The symptoms started one hour after ingestion and were treated. Five hours after ingestion, respiratory arrest occurred and mechanical ventilation was needed for three hours. Following examinations after one week, one month and one year suggested that full recovery was made. The same boy also showed occurrence of Tachycardia, frothy saliva (1 hour after ingestion), watery bowel movements (90 minutes after ingestion), increased urine WBC counts, inability to control his head and limbs, occasional twitching, pupils non-reactive to light, purposeless eye movements, palpable liver and spleen and there were some symptoms of paralysis.

Testing on rats with 10 mg/kg/day and 2 mg/kg/day showed no histopathological effect on the respiratory tract, neither did 13 week testing on dogs (8.25 mg/kg/day).  values for pure ethion in rats of 208 mg/kg, and for technical-grade ethion of 21 to 191 mg/kg,. Other reported oral LD50 values (for the technical product) are 40 mg/kg in mice and guinea pigs.  In a group of six male volunteers no differences in blood pressure or pulse rate were noted, neither in mice or dogs. Diarrhea did occur in mice orally exposed to ethion, severe signs of neurotoxicity were also present. The effects were consistent with cholinergic overstimulation of the gastrointestinal tract.

No hematological effects were reported in an experiment with six male volunteers, nor in rats or dogs. The volunteers did not show differences in muscle tone after intermediate-duration oral exposure, nor did the testing animals to different exposure. It is however knows that ethion can result in muscle tremors and fasciculations. The animal-testing studies on rats and dogs showed no effect on the kidneys and liver, but a different study showed an increased incidence in orange-colored urine. The animal-testing studies on rats and dogs did also not show dermal or ocular effects.

Rabbits, receiving 2.5 mg/kg/day of ethion showed a decrease in body weight, no effects were seen at 0.6 mg/kg/day. The decrease body, combined with reduced food consumption, was observed for rabbits receiving 9.6 mg/kg/day . Male and female dogs receiving 0.71 mg/kg/day did not show change in body weight, but dogs receiving 6.9 and 8.25 mg/kg/day showed reduced food consumption and reduced body weight.

In a study with human volunteers, a decrease of plasma cholinesterase was observed during 0.075 mg/kg/day (16% decrease), 0.1 mg/kg/day (23% decrease)  and 0.15 mg/kg/day (31%decrease) treatment periods. This was partially recovered after 7 days and fully recovered after 12 days. No effect on erythrocyte acetylcholinesterase was observed, nor signs of adverse neurological effects. Another study showed severe neurological effects after a single oral exposure in rats. For male rats salivation, tremors, nose bleeding, urination, diarrhea and convulsions occurred at 100 mg/kg and for female rats at 10 mg/kg. In a study with albino rats, it was observed that brain acetylcholinesterase was inhibited 22%, erythrocyte acetylcholinesterase 87% and plasma cholinesterase 100% for male rats after being fed 9 mg/kg/day of ethion for 93 days. After 14 days of recovery, plasma cholinesterase recovered completely and erythrocyte acetylcholinesterase recovered 63%. No effects were observed at 1 mg/kg/day. In a study with different rats, no effects on erythrocyte acetylcholinesterase were observed at 0, 0.1, 0.2, and 2 mg/kg/day of ethion. In a 90-day-study on dogs, in which the males received 6.9 mg/kg/day and females 8.25 mg/kg/day, ataxia, emesis, miosis and tremors were observed. Brain and erythrocyte acetylcholinesterase were inhibited (61-64% and 93-04% respectively). At 0.71 mg/kg/day in male dogs, the reduction of brain acetylcholinesterase was 23%. No effects were seen at 0.06 and 0.01 mg/kg/day. Based on these findings, a minimal risk level of 0,002 mg/kg/day for oral exposure for the acute and intermediate durations was established. A chronic-duration minimal risk level of 0.0004 mg/kg/day was calculated as well.

In one study, in which rats received a maximum of 1.25 mg/kg/day, no effects on reproduction were observed. In a study on pregnant river rats, eating 2.5 mg/kg/day, it was observed that the fetuses had increased incidences of delayed ossification of pubes. Another study found that the fetuses of pregnant rabbits, eating 9.6 mg/kg/day had increased incidences of fused sterna centers.

Inhalation 
Ethion is quite toxic to lethal via inhalation. One study, looking at technical-grade ethion, found an LC50 of 2.31 mg/m3 in male rats and of 0.45 mg/m3 in female rats. Other data reported a 4-hour LC50 in rats of 0.864 mg/L. As said above, ethion can also lead to pupillary constriction, muscle cramp, excessive salivation. Sweating. Nausea. Dizziness. Laboured breathing. Convulsions. unconsciousness. Besides the earlier mentioned symptoms, a sensation of tightness in the chest and rhinorrhea are common after inhalation.

Carcinogenic effects 
There are no indications that ethion is carcinogenic in rats and mice. Studies has been conducted in which rats and mice were fed ethion for two years. However, these animals didn't develop cancer any faster than animals that weren't given ethion. Ethion has not been classified for carcinogenicity by the United States Department of Health and Human Services (DHHS), the International Agency for Research on Cancer (IARC) or the EPA.

Treatment 
When orally exposed, gastric lavage shortly after exposure can be used to reduce the peak absorption. It is also suspected that treatment with active charcoal could be effective to reduce peak absorption. Safety guidelines also encourage to induce vomiting to reduce oral exposure, if the victim is still conscious.

In case of skin exposure, it is advised to wash and rinse with plenty of water and soap to reduce exposure. In case of inhalation fresh air is advised to reduce exposure.

To treat the ethion-exposure itself is done in the same way as exposure with other organophosphates. The main danger lies in respiratory problems, if symptoms are present then artificial respiration with an endotracheal tube is used as a treatment. The effect of ethion on muscles or nerves is counteracted with Atropine. Pralidoxime can be used to act against organophosphate poisoning, this must be given as fast as possible after the ethion poisoning for its efficacy is inhibited by the chemical change of ethion-enzyme in the body that occurs over time.

Effects on animals 
Ethion has an influence on the environment as it is persistent and thus might accumulate through plants and animals. When looking at songbirds, ethion is very toxic. The LD50 in red-winged blackbirds is 45 mg/kg. However, it is moderately toxic to birds like the bobwhite quail (LD50 is 128.8 mg/kg) and starlings (LD50 is greater than 304 mg/kg). These birds would be classified as ‘medium sized birds’. When looking at even larger, upland game birds (like the ring-necked pheasant and waterfowl like the mallard duck, ethion is barely toxic to nontoxic. This is a good example on how the toxicity to animals may depend strongly on the species. Furthermore, ethion is very toxic to aquatic organisms like freshwater and marine fish. On top of that, it is highly toxic to freshwater invertebrates with an LD50 of 0.056 µg/L to 0.0077 mg/L. The LD50 for marine and estuarine invertebrates are 0.04 to 0.05 mg/L. Ethion is practically nontoxic to honeybees. The LD50 is 50.55 µg per bee.

In a chronic toxicity study, rats were fed 0, 0.1, 0.2 or 2 mg/kg/day ethion for 18 months. However, no severe toxic effects were observed. The only significant change was a decrease of cholinesterase levels in the group with the highest dose. Therefore, the NOEL of this study was 0.2 mg/kg. The oral LD50 for pure ethion in rats is 208 mg/kg. The dermal LD50 in rats is 62 mg/kg, 890 mg/kg in rabbits, and 915 mg/kg in guinea pigs. For rats, the 4-hour LD50 is 0.864 mg/L ethion.

Detection ways 
Insecticides such as ethion can be detected with different general chemical detection ways, but most of the time the samples need to be prepared. And due to fact that the methods are not specific it can be quite difficult to determine if a specific substance is actually present. But a new and novel and simple detection way has been developed. In this method the interaction of silver nanoparticles (AgNPs) with ethion and the quenching of the resonance relay scattering (RRS) intensity are used. RRS can be used because the change in this was linearly correlated to the concentration of ethion (Range: 10.0–900.0 mg/L). Furthermore, it has as advantages over general detection methods that ethion can be measured in just 3 minutes and that no pretreatment of the sample is required before the measurement. From interference tests it became clear that the method has a very good selectivity for ethion. The limit of detection (LOD) was 3.7 mg/L and limit of quantification (LOQ) was 11.0 mg/L. Relative standard deviations (RSD) for 15.0 and 60.0 mg/L of ethion example concentration in water were 4.1 and 0.2 mg/L, respectively.

Microbial degradation 
Ethion remains a major contaminant of the environment in among others Australia because of (former) usage in agriculture. However, there are some microbes that can convert ethion. The Pseudomonas and Azospirillum species were able to digest ethion when cultivated in minimal salts medium. A significant decrease of the Ethion concentration was observed. On top of that, ethion was the only available source of carbon. After analysis of the compounds present in the media after digestion of ethion through bacteria, it turned out that no abiotic hydrolytic degradation products of Ethion (like ethion dioxon and ethion monoxon) were present. The biodigestion of ethion is probably used to support rapid growth.

References

External links

Acetylcholinesterase inhibitors
Organophosphate insecticides
Phosphorodithioates